Prior to spring training, the 1996 Minnesota Twins were projected to be a contending team. The team's chances significantly worsened on March 28, 1996. Kirby Puckett, the team's franchise player, had been tattooing the Grapefruit League (spring training) for a .360 average, but that morning woke up without vision in his right eye. He was eventually diagnosed with glaucoma. Several surgeries over the next few months could not restore vision in the eye. Puckett announced his retirement from baseball on July 12.  After beginning the season under the melancholy cloud of the Puckett situation, Manager Tom Kelly's team finished the year with a 78-84 record, which put it in fourth place in the American League Central Division.

Offseason
 October 9: Luis Rivas was signed as an amateur free agent by the Twins.
 December 5: Paul Molitor was signed as a free agent by the Twins.
January 29: Signed Roberto Kelly as a free agent.

Regular season

On April 24, the Twins crushed the Detroit Tigers 24-11.  The total of runs—both the Twins' 24 and the game's total of 35—were new highs in Twins history for a nine-inning game.
Only second baseman Chuck Knoblauch was selected from the Twins for the All-Star Game at Veteran's Stadium in Philadelphia.  Entering in the eighth inning as a reserve, he singled. His was just one of seven American League hits in the National League's 6-0 victory.
On July 25 at the Metrodome, seven Twins hit eight doubles to set a new mark.  The Twins drubbed the Boston Red Sox 16-6.
By season's end, several other offensive records had been set:  Chuck Knoblauch scored 140 times, besting Rod Carew's previous club high of 128.  Chip Hale had nineteen pinch hits on the year.  New season highs were set for most runs scored (877) and most runs allowed (900).  In addition, new club season highs were set in most hits (1663), most RBI (812), most doubles (332) and highest team batting average (.288).

Offense

Individual players on the team did excel.  Paul Molitor had a standout year in his first year with his hometown team, playing as the regular designated hitter and winning a Silver Slugger Award at that position.  He played in all but one game and hit .341 with 113 RBI and a league-best 225 hits.  On September 16 in Kansas City, he collected his 3,000th hit, a triple off of José Rosado.  He is the only player to obtain his 3,000th hit via a triple.  Along with Molitor, Chuck Knoblauch also hit .341.  Among the hits were 35 doubles.  He also stole 45 bases.  Marty Cordova had a respectable year, driving in 111 runs.

Pitching

The pitching did not match the offense.  Brad Radke, Frank Rodriguez, and Rich Robertson (the three R's) all spent the whole season in the starting rotation and had losing records.  The team's experiment moving Rick Aguilera from the closer's role to the starting rotation was not a successful one, as he started only 19 games.  Scott Aldred also started 17 games for the team.  Radke had the lowest ERA among the starters at 4.46.  The rest were over five.  Dave Stevens got the most saves at 11, but he was not an effective closer.  Mike Trombley and Dan Naulty had effective seasons out of the bullpen, but nobody else had an ERA under five.  Epitomizing the pitching woes, Mike Milchin had an ERA of 8.31 but the team still let him pitch in 26 games.

Defense

The only truly regular starters in the field were Knoblauch at second base, Pat Meares at shortstop, and Cordova in left field.  In a less-than-encouraging sign for the team's postseason prospects, Scott Stahoviak saw a majority of the time at first base.  Dave Hollins played 116 games at third, with Jeff Reboulet and Todd Walker also seeing time.  Greg Myers and Matt Walbeck platooned at catcher.  Rich Becker had the unenviable task of replacing Puckett in center field and played 121 games there.  Right field was a mish-mash, with Matt Lawton playing 60 games at the position, Roberto Kelly 54, Denny Hocking 33, and Ron Coomer 23.

Season standings

Record vs. opponents

Game log

|- bgcolor="ccffcc"
| 1 || April 1 || Tigers || 8–6 || Radke (1–0) || Lira || Stevens (1) || 30,185 || 1–0
|- bgcolor="ffbbbb"
| 2 || April 2 || Tigers || 6–10 || Sodowsky || Robertson (0–1) || — || 20,164 || 1–1
|- bgcolor="ccffcc"
| 3 || April 3 || Tigers || 16–7 || Mahomes (1–0) || Aldred || — || 12,256 || 2–1
|- bgcolor="ffbbbb"
| 4 || April 5 || Orioles || 1–2 || Mercker || Guardado (0–1) || Myers || 22,744 || 2–2
|- bgcolor="ccffcc"
| 5 || April 6 || Orioles || 8–3 || Radke (2–0) || Haynes || — || 22,334 || 3–2
|- bgcolor="ffbbbb"
| 6 || April 7 || Orioles || 2–4 || Mussina || Robertson (0–2) || Myers || 14,580 || 3–3
|- bgcolor="ffbbbb"
| 7 || April 9 || @ Red Sox || 1–9 || Gordon || Rodriguez (0–1) || — || 30,843 || 3–4
|- bgcolor="ccffcc"
| 8 || April 11 || @ Red Sox || 6–5 || Radke (3–0) || Clemens || Stevens (2) || 15,594 || 4–4
|- bgcolor="ffbbbb"
| 9 || April 12 || @ Orioles || 2–3 || Mussina || Robertson (0–3) || — || 42,602 || 4–5
|- bgcolor="ffbbbb"
| 10 || April 13 || @ Orioles || 6–7 || Benitez || Mahomes (1–1) || — || 42,644 || 4–6
|- bgcolor="ccffcc"
| 11 || April 14 || @ Orioles || 4–1 || Rodriguez (1–1) || Haynes || Stevens (3) || 42,660 || 5–6
|- bgcolor="ffbbbb"
| 12 || April 16 || Indians || 2–7 || Hershiser || Radke (3–1) || — || 13,103 || 5–7
|- bgcolor="ccffcc"
| 13 || April 17 || Indians || 9–8 || Hansell (1–0) || Shuey || Stevens (4) || 11,276 || 6–7
|- bgcolor="ccffcc"
| 14 || April 19 || Yankees || 7–1 || Rodriguez (2–1) || Gooden || — || 20,279 || 7–7
|- bgcolor="ffbbbb"
| 15 || April 20 || Yankees || 6–7 || Wickman || Guardado (0–2) || Wetteland || 24,586 || 7–8
|- bgcolor="ffbbbb"
| 16 || April 21 || Yankees || 5–9 || Rogers || Radke (3–2) || — || 20,115 || 7–9
|- bgcolor="ffbbbb"
| 17 || April 22 || Red Sox || 1–4 || Sele || Robertson (0–4) || Slocumb || 11,340 || 7–10
|- bgcolor="ccffcc"
| 18 || April 23 || Red Sox || 8–6 || Naulty (1–0) || Hudson || Stevens (5) || 11,533 || 8–10
|- bgcolor="ccffcc"
| 19 || April 24 || @ Tigers || 24–11 || Bennett (1–0) || Veres || — || 12,189 || 9–10
|- bgcolor="ccffcc"
| 20 || April 25 || @ Tigers || 11–1 || Hawkins (1–0) || Aldred || Hansell (1) || 11,804 || 10–10
|- bgcolor="ffbbbb"
| 21 || April 26 || @ Yankees || 4–5 || Rivera || Radke (3–3) || Wetteland || 14,450 || 10–11
|- bgcolor="ccffcc"
| 22 || April 27 || @ Yankees || 8–6 (10) || Bennett (2–0) || Wickman || — || 20,025 || 11–11
|- bgcolor="ffbbbb"
| 23 || April 28 || @ Yankees || 3–6 || Rivera || Rodriguez (2–2) || Wetteland || 24,793 || 11–12
|- bgcolor="ccffcc"
| 24 || April 29 || Royals || 11–6 || Hansell (2–0) || Clark || Bennett (1) || 10,237 || 12–12
|- bgcolor="ccffcc"
| 25 || April 30 || Royals || 16–7 || Naulty (2–0) || Magnante || — || 10,503 || 13–12
|-

|- bgcolor="ccffcc"
| 26 || May 1 || Royals || 6–5 (10) || Stevens (1–0) || Montgomery || — || 11,975 || 14–12
|- bgcolor="ffbbbb"
| 27 || May 3 || @ Angels || 1–4 || Finley || Robertson (0–5) || Percival || 24,505 || 14–13
|- bgcolor="ffbbbb"
| 28 || May 4 || @ Angels || 2–5 || Grimsley || Rodriguez (2–3) || — || 29,264 || 14–14
|- bgcolor="ffbbbb"
| 29 || May 5 || @ Angels || 1–5 || Boskie || Hawkins (1–1) || — || 35,541 || 14–15
|- bgcolor="ffbbbb"
| 30 || May 6 || @ Mariners || 4–5 || Wells || Radke (3–4) || Charlton || 32,203 || 14–16
|- bgcolor="ccffcc"
| 31 || May 7 || @ Mariners || 2–0 || Parra (1–0) || Wolcott || Stevens (6) || 15,626 || 15–16
|- bgcolor="ccffcc"
| 32 || May 8 || @ Mariners || 7–5 (10) || Guardado (1–2) || Wells || Stevens (7) || 22,175 || 16–16
|- bgcolor="ffbbbb"
| 33 || May 10 || @ Athletics || 5–15 || Wojciechowski || Rodriguez (2–4) || — || 8,278 || 16–17
|- bgcolor="ffbbbb"
| 34 || May 11 || @ Athletics || 5–12 || Prieto || Radke (3–5) || — || 15,791 || 16–18
|- bgcolor="ffbbbb"
| 35 || May 12 || @ Athletics || 3–8 || Wengert || Parra (1–1) || — || 13,430 || 16–19
|- bgcolor="ffbbbb"
| 36 || May 14 || Blue Jays || 2–4 || Hanson || Robertson (0–6) || Timlin || 13,483 || 16–20
|- bgcolor="ccffcc"
| 37 || May 15 || Blue Jays || 2–1 || Rodriguez (3–4) || Hentgen || — || 11,793 || 17–20
|- bgcolor="ccffcc"
| 38 || May 16 || Blue Jays || 4–1 || Radke (4–5) || Quantrill || Stevens (8) || 13,538 || 18–20
|- bgcolor="ffbbbb"
| 39 || May 17 || Brewers || 1–12 || Karl || Parra (1–2) || — || 26,733 || 18–21
|- bgcolor="ffbbbb"
| 40 || May 18 || Brewers || 3–7 || Miranda || Mahomes (1–2) || Fetters || 30,593 || 18–22
|- bgcolor="ffbbbb"
| 41 || May 19 || Brewers || 2–4 || Sparks || Robertson (0–7) || Fetters || 24,411 || 18–23
|- bgcolor="ffbbbb"
| 42 || May 20 || Brewers || 2–3 || Bones || Rodriguez (3–5) || Fetters || 13,376 || 18–24
|- bgcolor="ccffcc"
| 43 || May 21 || Rangers || 4–3 || Milchin (1–0) || Henneman || — || 12,323 || 19–24
|- bgcolor="ffbbbb"
| 44 || May 22 || Rangers || 5–6 || Pavlik || Parra (1–3) || Henneman || 17,955 || 19–25
|- bgcolor="ffbbbb"
| 45 || May 23 || @ Blue Jays || 4–5 (10) || Janzen || Milchin (1–1) || — || 31,163 || 19–26
|- bgcolor="ccffcc"
| 46 || May 24 || @ Blue Jays || 4–0 || Robertson (1–7) || Hanson || — || 33,141 || 20–26
|- bgcolor="ccffcc"
| 47 || May 25 || @ Blue Jays || 6–4 (10) || Guardado (2–2) || Castillo || Stevens (9) || 34,118 || 21–26
|- bgcolor="ccffcc"
| 48 || May 26 || @ Blue Jays || 9–3 || Naulty (3–0) || Bohanon || — || 30,170 || 22–26
|- bgcolor="ffbbbb"
| 49 || May 28 || @ Brewers || 3–7 || Karl || Mahomes (1–3) || Garcia || 10,117 || 22–27
|- bgcolor="ccffcc"
| 50 || May 29 || @ Brewers || 8–7 (12) || Hansell (3–0) || Lloyd || — || 14,324 || 23–27
|- bgcolor="ffbbbb"
| 51 || May 31 || @ Rangers || 2–7 || Hill || Rodriguez (3–6) || — || 32,861 || 23–28
|-

|- bgcolor="ccffcc"
| 52 || June 1 || @ Rangers || 9–5 || Milchin (2–1) || Henneman || — || 43,413 || 24–28
|- bgcolor="ccffcc"
| 53 || June 2 || @ Rangers || 6–5 || Guardado (3–2) || Russell || — || 33,809 || 25–28
|- bgcolor="ccffcc"
| 54 || June 3 || Angels || 9–3 || Trombley (1–0) || Finley || — || 10,589 || 26–28
|- bgcolor="ccffcc"
| 55 || June 4 || Angels || 5–3 || Rodriguez (4–6) || Grimsley || Guardado (1) || 10,899 || 27–28
|- bgcolor="ccffcc"
| 56 || June 5 || Angels || 14–3 || Aldred (1–0) || Langston || Hansell (2) || 10,639 || 28–28
|- bgcolor="ffbbbb"
| 57 || June 7 || Athletics || 4–6 || Reyes || Radke (4–6) || Corsi || 14,999 || 28–29
|- bgcolor="ccffcc"
| 58 || June 8 || Athletics || 4–2 || Robertson (2–7) || Wojciechowski || Guardado (2) || — || 29–29
|- bgcolor="ffbbbb"
| 59 || June 8 || Athletics || 7–13 || Wasdin || Mahomes (1–4) || — || 22,164 || 29–30
|- bgcolor="ccffcc"
| 60 || June 9 || Athletics || 5–3 || Rodriguez (5–6) || Wengert || — || 13,291 || 30–30
|- bgcolor="ccffcc"
| 61 || June 10 || Mariners || 13–6 || Aldred (2–0) || Wagner || Trombley (1) || 17,134 || 31–30
|- bgcolor="ffbbbb"
| 62 || June 11 || Mariners || 8–18 || Wells || Aguilera (0–1) || Hurtado || 14,395 || 31–31
|- bgcolor="ffbbbb"
| 63 || June 12 || Mariners || 3–5 || Wolcott || Radke (4–7) || Charlton || 15,830 || 31–32
|- bgcolor="ffbbbb"
| 64 || June 14 || Tigers || 4–5 || Gohr || Robertson (2–8) || Olson || 22,831 || 31–33
|- bgcolor="ffbbbb"
| 65 || June 15 || Tigers || 4–6 || Olivares || Rodriguez (5–7) || Olson || 17,099 || 31–34
|- bgcolor="ccffcc"
| 66 || June 16 || Tigers || 4–1 || Aguilera (1–1) || Lira || Hansell (3) || 20,641 || 32–34
|- bgcolor="ccffcc"
| 67 || June 17 || @ Yankees || 6–3 || Aldred (3–0) || Mendoza || Naulty (1) || 16,189 || 33–34
|- bgcolor="ffbbbb"
| 68 || June 18 || @ Yankees || 0–2 || Rogers || Radke (4–8) || Wetteland || 17,593 || 33–35
|- bgcolor="ccffcc"
| 69 || June 20 || @ Tigers || 7–3 || Rodriguez (6–7) || Olivares || — || 8,310 || 34–35
|- bgcolor="ffbbbb"
| 70 || June 21 || @ Tigers || 0–2 || Lira || Aguilera (1–2) || — || 13,127 || 34–36
|- bgcolor="ffbbbb"
| 71 || June 22 || @ Tigers || 0–6 || Williams || Aldred (3–1) || — || 14,506 || 34–37
|- bgcolor="ffbbbb"
| 72 || June 23 || @ Tigers || 8–10 || Urbani || Radke (4–9) || — || 13,994 || 34–38
|- bgcolor="ccffcc"
| 73 || June 24 || Yankees || 3–0 || Robertson (3–8) || Pettitte || — || 20,488 || 35–38
|- bgcolor="ccffcc"
| 74 || June 25 || Yankees || 6–1 || Rodriguez (7–7) || Boehringer || — || — || 36–38
|- bgcolor="ffbbbb"
| 75 || June 25 || Yankees || 2–6 || Mendoza || Serafini (0–1) || — || 16,641 || 36–39
|- bgcolor="ffbbbb"
| 76 || June 26 || Yankees || 1–2 || Polley || Guardado (3–3) || Wetteland || 19,116 || 36–40
|- bgcolor="ffbbbb"
| 77 || June 28 || @ Royals || 2–6 || Appier || Radke (4–10) || — || 21,515 || 36–41
|- bgcolor="ccffcc"
| 78 || June 29 || @ Royals || 12–7 || Trombley (2–0) || Linton || — || 23,232 || 37–41
|- bgcolor="ccffcc"
| 79 || June 30 || @ Royals || 5–2 || Rodriguez (8–7) || Gubicza || Stevens (10) || 28,246 || 38–41
|-

|- bgcolor="ccffcc"
| 80 || July 1 || @ White Sox || 10–7 || Aguilera (2–2) || Sirotka || — || 19,211 || 39–41
|- bgcolor="ffbbbb"
| 81 || July 2 || @ White Sox || 4–7 || Fernandez || Aldred (3–2) || Hernandez || 18,357 || 39–42
|- bgcolor="ccffcc"
| 82 || July 3 || @ White Sox || 6–5 || Radke (5–10) || Andujar || Stevens (11) || 26,113 || 40–42
|- bgcolor="ffbbbb"
| 83 || July 4 || Royals || 3–5 || Linton || Robertson (3–9) || Montgomery || 37,295 || 40–43
|- bgcolor="ccffcc"
| 84 || July 5 || Royals || 9–8 || Guardado (4–3) || Montgomery || — || 18,465 || 41–43
|- bgcolor="ffbbbb"
| 85 || July 6 || Royals || 5–8 || Haney || Aguilera (2–3) || Montgomery || 18,699 || 41–44
|- bgcolor="ffbbbb"
| 86 || July 7 || Royals || 2–8 || Belcher || Aldred (3–3) || — || 14,251 || 41–45
|- bgcolor="ffbbbb"
| 87 || July 11 || Indians || 7–11 || McDowell || Radke (5–11) || — || 16,438 || 41–46
|- bgcolor="ffbbbb"
| 88 || July 12 || Indians || 5–7 || Mesa || Stevens (1–1) || Shuey || 18,246 || 41–47
|- bgcolor="ffbbbb"
| 89 || July 13 || Indians || 11–19 || Ogea || Aguilera (2–4) || — || 31,552 || 41–48
|- bgcolor="ccffcc"
| 90 || July 14 || Indians || 5–4 || Guardado (5–3) || Plunk || — || 25,312 || 42–48
|- bgcolor="ccffcc"
| 91 || July 15 || White Sox || 16–5 || Aldred (4–3) || McCaskill || — || 13,636 || 43–48
|- bgcolor="ffbbbb"
| 92 || July 16 || White Sox || 2–11 || Alvarez || Radke (5–12) || — || 18,502 || 43–49
|- bgcolor="ccffcc"
| 93 || July 17 || White Sox || 4–3 || Trombley (3–0) || Simas || — || 20,755 || 44–49
|- bgcolor="ffbbbb"
| 94 || July 18 || @ Indians || 4–5 || Graves || Guardado (5–4) || — || 40,934 || 44–50
|- bgcolor="ccffcc"
| 95 || July 19 || @ Indians || 3–2 || Rodriguez (9–7) || Nagy || Naulty (2) || 42,373 || 45–50
|- bgcolor="ffbbbb"
| 96 || July 20 || @ Indians || 5–6 (11) || Shuey || Stevens (1–2) || — || 43,433 || 45–51
|- bgcolor="ffbbbb"
| 97 || July 21 || @ Indians || 5–7 || McDowell || Radke (5–13) || Shuey || 42,341 || 45–52
|- bgcolor="ccffcc"
| 98 || July 22 || @ Orioles || 9–5 || Robertson (4–9) || Haynes || Trombley (2) || 42,129 || 46–52
|- bgcolor="ccffcc"
| 99 || July 23 || @ Orioles || 3–2 || Aguilera (3–4) || Wells || Naulty (3) || 42,006 || 47–52
|- bgcolor="ccffcc"
| 100 || July 24 || @ Orioles || 11–4 || Rodriguez (10–7) || Erickson || — || 46,181 || 48–52
|- bgcolor="ccffcc"
| 101 || July 25 || Red Sox || 16–6 || Parra (2–3) || Wakefield || — || 13,924 || 49–52
|- bgcolor="ccffcc"
| 102 || July 26 || Red Sox || 5–1 || Radke (6–13) || Clemens || — || 17,768 || 50–52
|- bgcolor="ffbbbb"
| 103 || July 27 || Red Sox || 5–9 || Gordon || Naulty (3–1) || — || 22,128 || 50–53
|- bgcolor="ccffcc"
| 104 || July 28 || Red Sox || 9–8 || Aguilera (4–4) || Sele || Naulty (4) || 17,448 || 51–53
|- bgcolor="ffbbbb"
| 105 || July 30 || Orioles || 4–16 || Coppinger || Rodriguez (10–8) || — || 16,708 || 51–54
|- bgcolor="ffbbbb"
| 106 || July 31 || Orioles || 3–9 || Mussina || Trombley (3–1) || — || 15,897 || 51–55
|-

|- bgcolor="ffbbbb"
| 107 || August 1 || Orioles || 2–4 || Wells || Robertson (4–10) || Myers || 20,379 || 51–56
|- bgcolor="ffbbbb"
| 108 || August 2 || @ Red Sox || 10–11 || Brandenburg || Naulty (3–2) || — || 28,041 || 51–57
|- bgcolor="ffbbbb"
| 109 || August 3 || @ Red Sox || 3–6 || Sele || Rodriguez (10–9) || Hudson || 19,860 || 51–58
|- bgcolor="ccffcc"
| 110 || August 3 || @ Red Sox || 6–0 || Aldred (5–3) || Suppan || — || 29,135 || 52–58
|- bgcolor="ffbbbb"
| 111 || August 4 || @ Red Sox || 6–13 || Eshelman || Klingenbeck (0–1) || — || 29,939 || 52–59
|- bgcolor="ccffcc"
| 112 || August 6 || @ Angels || 4–1 || Radke (7–13) || Springer || Guardado (3) || 20,058 || 53–59
|- bgcolor="ccffcc"
| 113 || August 7 || @ Angels || 4–0 || Robertson (5–10) || Finley || — || 18,611 || 54–59
|- bgcolor="ccffcc"
| 114 || August 8 || @ Angels || 13–5 || Aguilera (5–4) || Boskie || — || 21,283 || 55–59
|- bgcolor="ccffcc"
| 115 || August 9 || @ Mariners || 6–5 || Parra (3–3) || Wolcott || Rodriguez (1) || 25,130 || 56–59
|- bgcolor="ccffcc"
| 116 || August 10 || @ Mariners || 10–4 || Klingenbeck (1–1) || Hitchcock || — || 34,381 || 57–59
|- bgcolor="ccffcc"
| 117 || August 11 || @ Mariners || 6–3 || Radke (8–13) || Wells || Rodriguez (2) || 36,114 || 58–59
|- bgcolor="ffbbbb"
| 118 || August 12 || @ Athletics || 1–11 || Prieto || Robertson (5–11) || — || 10,071 || 58–60
|- bgcolor="ccffcc"
| 119 || August 13 || @ Athletics || 6–2 || Aguilera (6–4) || Wengert || — || 11,156 || 59–60
|- bgcolor="ccffcc"
| 120 || August 14 || @ Athletics || 13–7 || Rodriguez (11–9) || Telgheder || — || 12,729 || 60–60
|- bgcolor="ccffcc"
| 121 || August 16 || Blue Jays || 5–4 (10) || Parra (4–3) || Quantrill || — || 19,838 || 61–60
|- bgcolor="ccffcc"
| 122 || August 17 || Blue Jays || 11–1 || Robertson (6–11) || Hanson || — || 20,354 || 62–60
|- bgcolor="ffbbbb"
| 123 || August 18 || Blue Jays || 2–6 || Hentgen || Aguilera (6–5) || — || 18,010 || 62–61
|- bgcolor="ffbbbb"
| 124 || August 19 || Brewers || 1–6 || D'Amico || Rodriguez (11–10) || — || 21,879 || 62–62
|- bgcolor="ccffcc"
| 125 || August 20 || Brewers || 12–7 || Parra (5–3) || Bones || — || 14,630 || 63–62
|- bgcolor="ffbbbb"
| 126 || August 21 || Brewers || 7–10 || Jones || Stevens (1–3) || Fetters || 15,885 || 63–63
|- bgcolor="ffbbbb"
| 127 || August 22 || Rangers || 2–11 || Hill || Robertson (6–12) || — || 17,342 || 63–64
|- bgcolor="ccffcc"
| 128 || August 23 || Rangers || 9–2 || Aguilera (7–5) || Oliver || — || 16,166 || 64–64
|- bgcolor="ccffcc"
| 129 || August 24 || Rangers || 6–5 || Rodriguez (12–10) || Pavlik || Trombley (3) || 16,648 || 65–64
|- bgcolor="ffbbbb"
| 130 || August 25 || Rangers || 2–13 || Witt || Miller (0–1) || — || 14,818 || 65–65
|- bgcolor="ffbbbb"
| 131 || August 26 || @ Blue Jays || 3–5 || Guzman || Radke (8–14) || Timlin || 31,134 || 65–66
|- bgcolor="ccffcc"
| 132 || August 27 || @ Blue Jays || 6–4 (11) || Trombley (4–1) || Quantrill || — || 30,033 || 66–66
|- bgcolor="ffbbbb"
| 133 || August 28 || @ Blue Jays || 1–6 || Hentgen || Aguilera (7–6) || — || 30,106 || 66–67
|- bgcolor="ccffcc"
| 134 || August 29 || @ Brewers || 6–1 || Rodriguez (13–10) || Karl || — || 14,922 || 67–67
|- bgcolor="ffbbbb"
| 135 || August 30 || @ Brewers || 4–5 (12) || Wickman || Parra (5–4) || — || 17,444 || 67–68
|- bgcolor="ffbbbb"
| 136 || August 31 || @ Brewers || 2–3 || Jones || Robertson (6–13) || Fetters || 20,187 || 67–69
|-

|- bgcolor="ccffcc"
| 137 || September 1 || @ Brewers || 6–2 || Aldred (6–3) || Van Egmond || — || 17,074 || 68–69
|- bgcolor="ccffcc"
| 138 || September 2 || @ Rangers || 6–4 || Aguilera (8–6) || Hill || Guardado (4) || 24,786 || 69–69
|- bgcolor="ffbbbb"
| 139 || September 3 || @ Rangers || 7–9 || Witt || Rodriguez (13–11) || Henneman || 28,401 || 69–70
|- bgcolor="ccffcc"
| 140 || September 4 || @ Rangers || 7–6 || Robertson (7–13) || Heredia || Trombley (4) || 29,744 || 70–70
|- bgcolor="ccffcc"
| 141 || September 6 || Angels || 6–2 || Radke (9–14) || Finley || — || 13,006 || 71–70
|- bgcolor="ccffcc"
| 142 || September 7 || Angels || 6–3 || Stevens (2–3) || Boskie || Trombley (5) || 51,011 || 72–70
|- bgcolor="ffbbbb"
| 143 || September 8 || Angels || 2–4 || Abbott || Rodriguez (13–12) || Percival || 14,378 || 72–71
|- bgcolor="ffbbbb"
| 144 || September 10 || Athletics || 0–7 || Telgheder || Robertson (7–14) || — || 9,676 || 72–72
|- bgcolor="ccffcc"
| 145 || September 11 || Athletics || 7–2 || Radke (10–14) || Adams || — || 9,493 || 73–72
|- bgcolor="ccffcc"
| 146 || September 12 || Athletics || 4–3 (12) || Stevens (3–3) || Mohler || — || 9,712 || 74–72
|- bgcolor="ffbbbb"
| 147 || September 13 || Mariners || 7–13 || Wells || Miller (0–2) || — || 15,510 || 74–73
|- bgcolor="ffbbbb"
| 148 || September 14 || Mariners || 3–5 (10) || Ayala || Guardado (5–5) || Charlton || 18,002 || 74–74
|- bgcolor="ffbbbb"
| 149 || September 15 || Mariners || 0–7 || Torres || Robertson (7–15) || — || 25,142 || 74–75
|- bgcolor="ffbbbb"
| 150 || September 16 || @ Royals || 5–6 || Rosado || Radke (10–15) || Bluma || 16,843 || 74–76
|- bgcolor="ffbbbb"
| 151 || September 17 || @ Royals || 2–4 || Haney || Aldred (6–4) || Bluma || 11,809 || 74–77
|- bgcolor="ccffcc"
| 152 || September 18 || @ Royals || 7–4 || Miller (1–2) || Belcher || — || 11,588 || 75–77
|- bgcolor="ffbbbb"
| 153 || September 19 || @ White Sox || 3–8 || Sirotka || Rodriguez (13–13) || Castillo || 14,253 || 75–78
|- bgcolor="ffbbbb"
| 154 || September 20 || @ White Sox || 3–7 || Tapani || Robertson (7–16) || — || 15,673 || 75–79
|- bgcolor="ccffcc"
| 155 || September 21 || @ White Sox || 4–3 || Radke (11–15) || Alvarez || Trombley (6) || 18,866 || 76–79
|- bgcolor="ffbbbb"
| 156 || September 22 || @ White Sox || 1–5 || Fernandez || Aldred (6–5) || — || 20,111 || 76–80
|- bgcolor="ffbbbb"
| 157 || September 23 || @ Indians || 6–7 || Graves || Parra (5–5) || Mesa || 42,299 || 76–81
|- bgcolor="ffbbbb"
| 158 || September 24 || @ Indians || 5–7 || Ogea || Rodriguez (13–14) || Mesa || 42,272 || 76–82
|- bgcolor="ffbbbb"
| 159 || September 25 || @ Indians || 3–6 || Nagy || Robertson (7–17) || — || 42,469 || 76–83
|- bgcolor="ffbbbb"
| 160 || September 27 || White Sox || 2–4 || Fernandez || Radke (11–16) || Hernandez || 13,058 || 76–84
|- bgcolor="ccffcc"
| 161 || September 28 || White Sox || 7–6 || Trombley (5–1) || Castillo || — || 34,008 || 77–84
|- bgcolor="ccffcc"
| 162 || September 29 || White Sox || 5–4 (10) || Guardado (6–5) || Hernandez || — || 13,306 || 78–84
|-

|-
| Legend:       = Win       = LossBold = Twins team member

Detailed records

Roster

Notable Transactions
May 28: Selected Scott Aldred off waivers from the Detroit Tigers.
June 4: In the 1996 amateur draft, the Twins drafted future major leaguers such as Jacque Jones (2nd round), Chad Allen (4th round), and Chad Moeller (7th round).  The Twins botched the signing of first baseman Travis Lee, whom they signed in the first round with the second overall pick.  Lee exploited a never-before used clause that allows a draft pick to become a free agent if a team doesn't make an offer within 15 days of the draft.  After the Twins failed to do this, Lee left for the Arizona Diamondbacks, who gave him a $10 million signing bonus.  The Twins had the last laugh, however, as Lee has proven to be a below-average hitter who has bounced from team to team.
August 29: Traded Dave Hollins to the Seattle Mariners for a player to be named later.  On September 30, the Mariners sent David Ortiz to the Twins to complete the trade.
 September 13, 1996: David Ortiz was sent by the Seattle Mariners to the Minnesota Twins to complete an earlier deal made on August 29, 1996. The Seattle Mariners sent a player to be named later to the Minnesota Twins for Dave Hollins.

Player stats

Batting

Starters by position
Note: Pos = Position; G = Games played; AB = At bats; H = Hits; Avg. = Batting average; HR = Home runs; RBI = Runs batted in

Other batters
Note: G = Games played; AB = At bats; H = Hits; Avg. = Batting average; HR = Home runs; RBI = Runs batted in

Pitching

Starting pitchers
Note: G = Games pitched; IP = Innings pitched; W = Wins; L = Losses; ERA = Earned run average; SO = Strikeouts

Other pitchers
Note: G = Games pitched; IP = Innings pitched; W = Wins; L = Losses; ERA = Earned run average; SO = Strikeouts

Relief pitchers
Note: G = Games pitched; W = Wins; L = Losses; SV = Saves; ERA = Earned run average; SO = Strikeouts

Miscellaneous
The lone representative of the Twins in the All-Star Game was second baseman Chuck Knoblauch.
The highest paid Twin in 1996 was Chuck Knoblauch at $4,670,000; followed by Rick Aguilera  at $3,500,000.

Other post-season awards
Calvin R. Griffith Award (Most Valuable Twin) – Chuck Knoblauch
Joseph W. Haynes Award (Twins Pitcher of the Year) – Frank Rodriguez
Bill Boni Award (Twins Outstanding Rookie) – Ron Coomer
Charles O. Johnson Award (Most Improved Twin) – Rich Becker
Dick Siebert Award (Upper Midwest Player of the Year) – Paul Molitor
The above awards are voted on by the Twin Cities chapter of the BBWAA
Carl R. Pohlad Award (Outstanding Community Service) – Paul Molitor
Sherry Robertson Award (Twins Outstanding Farm System Player) – Todd Walker

Outfielder Kirby Puckett won the Roberto Clemente Award, given annually to the Major League Baseball (MLB) player who "best exemplifies the game of baseball, sportsmanship, community involvement and the individual's contribution to his team", as voted on by baseball fans and members of the media.

Farm system

References

External links
Player stats from www.baseball-reference.com
1996 Standings

Minnesota Twins seasons
Minnesota Twins
Twins